Aluligera is a genus of flies belonging to the family Lesser Dung flies.

Species
A. alpina Richards, 1966
A. bicolor (Richards, 1965)
A. brunneata Richards, 1966
A. flavena (Richards, 1966)
A. grossa Richards, 1955
A. grossula Richards, 1966
A. ituriensis Richards, 1966
A. laqueata Richards, 1966
A. leucocephala Richards, 1966
A. leucothorax Richards, 1966
A. maculata (Richards, 1965)
A. montana Richards, 1951
A. nigra (Richards, 1965)
A. pallidisternum Richards, 1966
A. polychaeta Richards, 1966
A. sessilis Richards, 1966
A. stenosoma Richards, 1955
A. varicolor (Richards, 1957)
A. vittigera (Richards, 1980)
A. xanthographa (Richards, 1959)

References

Sphaeroceridae
Diptera of Africa
Brachycera genera